Massangano is a town and commune of Angola, located in the province of Cuanza Norte.

Its name is sometimes written Masango. It was esblished by the Portuguese in 1582 as Fort Nossa Senhora da Vitória to be their base of operations in the interior of modern Angola until the late 17th-century.

See also 

 Communes of Angola

References 

Provincial capitals in Angola
Populated places in Cabinda Province
Port cities and towns in Angola
Municipalities of Angola
Populated places in Cuanza Norte Province
Communes in Cuanza Norte Province